was a Japanese nationalist, Shinto fundamentalist, and scholar of kokugaku as well as classical Japanese literature. He was also a historian, author, and military officer.

Biography
His father possessed a sword that once belonged to Katō Kiyomasa.

In 1918, he contracted pleurisy and took a leave of absence from school until the following year. Around this time he wrote one of his early poems, . Pleurisy haunted him for the remainder of his life, and several years before his death he was found to have lesions in his hilar nodes.

He was known for his simultaneous pursuit of literary and martial arts.

After entering college in 1923, he became influenced by the professor of literature  and developed an interest in kokugaku, by that time a mostly abandoned discipline, and studied the writings of Motoori Norinaga. Hasuda was strongly impressed by the historian Ishihara Shikō's book on the Shinpūren Rebellion, . Ishihara elaborated upon the teachings of the nativist Hayashi Ōen, according to whom the affairs of government ought to be entirely subordinated to the affairs of Shinto through systematic divination, a position that Hasuda respected.

Through , Hasuda became acquainted with the young Hiraoka Kimitake, later known as Yukio Mishima. On October 25, 1943, Hasuda was called to active service in the Imperial Japanese Army. Before his departure for Southeast Asia, he reportedly said to Mishima, .  recalled Hasuda raging as he prepared to leave, saying .

In 1945, Hasuda's platoon advanced to Shōnan where he was assigned to a mortar regiment headquartered at the Royal Palace of Johor. Immediately after Hasuda and his men arrived in Singapore, one of his subordinates got into a fight with an officer of the Kenpeitai and injured him. When the subordinate was about to be punished by the regimental authorities, Hasuda suggested that he, as the platoon commander, was responsible for the subordinate's negligence, and he and his Captain went to personally apologize. The subordinate's punishment was dropped.

At the time of Hirohito's order to stand down, Hasuda's commanding officer Colonel  announced that the division would surrender immediately to British forces. Upon hearing Nakajō's statement, Hasuda flew into a rage. By that point, Hasuda had already become convinced that Nakajō was in fact a Korean spy who had sabotaged the division and whose real name was "Kim" (金). Hasuda had brought his father's sword with him, and wanted to use it to kill Nakajō. However, he was unskilled in kendō and hesitated, deciding to use his pistol instead. When Nakajō was proceeding to Shōnan Shrine in order to burn the regimental flags prior to surrender, Hasuda ambushed his entourage. Accusing the others of treason, he shot Nakajō to death and then immediately killed himself with the same pistol. After his death, a postcard was found on his person into which he had written . He was cremated by Japanese personnel in Johor Bahru.

After the war, the Allied powers did not allow Hasuda's remains to be returned to Japan. As a result, his bones were disposed of in an unmarked grave in a rubber tree orchard near Singapore.

References 

1904 births
1945 deaths
People from Kumamoto Prefecture
Writers from Kumamoto Prefecture
Japanese anti-communists
Kokugaku scholars
Japanese nationalists
Japanese Shintoists
Anti-Christian sentiment
Anti-Americanism
Imperial Japanese Army personnel of World War II
Japanese military personnel who committed suicide
Suicides by firearm